Charles Abba Baugher (September 9, 1893 – November 2, 1962) is an American academic, a former professor and President of Elizabethtown College.

Baugher became President of Elizabethtown College in 1941 and served until 1961.

The Baugher Student Center on Elizabethtown College's campus is named after him.

References

Presidents of Elizabethtown College
1962 deaths
1893 births
20th-century American academics